Sir Henry Goodere (1534–1595) was an English landowner, Member of Parliament for Stafford (1563) and Coventry (1571), and a supporter of Mary, Queen of Scots.

Family background
He was the son of Francis Goodere of Polesworth Hall and Ursula Rowlett.

Career
He went to meet Mary, Queen of Scots in 1568 at Workington when she first came into England from Scotland. He gave her a cipher code to write to her friends.

Goodere was held in the Tower of London in 1571 and interviewed by his family relative William Cecil and the Earl of Southampton on suspicion of treason, in connection with a plan for Mary to marry the Duke of Norfolk and the Ridolfi plot. He was questioned about a plan for Mary to escape and be escorted by Gerard Lowther to one of his houses, a former abbey.

Goodere wrote a poem defending the Scottish queen, "If former good could answer present ill". His political enemy Thomas Norton responded to the poem with another verse.

He was released and subsequently knighted in 1588. He became the Queen's chief bodyguard. He was High Sheriff of Warwickshire in 1570 and High Steward of the Royal Town of Sutton Coldfield from 1582 until his death.

Family and namesake son-in-law
He married Frances Lowther. Her father, Richard Lowther, was also questioned about the cipher given to Mary. Their daughter was Frances Goodere. She married Henry Goodere (died 1627). The younger Henry Goodere was the founder of "the Polesworth Circle", a private organization that influenced most of Great Britain through Shakespeare's literary works, Inigo Jones' architectural work and Michael Drayton's poetry. He was friends with John Donne. His society helped finance the 'Virginia adventure'.

References

1534 births
1595 deaths
English knights
16th-century English people
High Sheriffs of Warwickshire
Prisoners in the Tower of London
Sheriffs of Warwickshire
Members of Parliament for Coventry